Ruvu may refer to:

 Ruvu River, a river in Morogoro and Pwani Regions of eastern Tanzania
 River Ruvu, a source of the Pangani River or Jipe Ruvu in northeastern Tanzania
 Ruvu, Kibaha District, a town in Tanzania
 Ruvu Ward in Same District, Tanzania
 Ruvu languages, a class of Northeast Coast Bantu languages
 Ruvu Shooting, a football club in Dar es Salaam, Tanzania
 JKT Ruvu Stars, a football club in Dodoma, Tanzania